The nineteenth European Masters Athletics Championships were held in Izmir, Turkey, from August 22–31, 2014. The European Masters Athletics Championships serve the division of the sport of athletics for people over 35 years of age, referred to as masters athletics.

Results

100 metres

200 metres

400 metres

800 metres

5000 metres

4x100 metres relay

High jump

Long jump

Triple jump

Shot put

Discus throw

Hammer throw

Javelin throw

Weight throw

Throws pentathlon

References 
 

2014 European Masters Athletics Championships